Oman is a country on the Arabian Peninsula. Tourism in Oman grew considerably during the 2000s, and a 2013 report predicted that it would become one of the largest industries in the nation. In 2019, Oman attracted about 4.1 million visitors from around the world, a massive increase from 3.1 million in 2017 as per the 2019 Tourism Statistic Bulletin from the National Centre for Statistics and Information (NCSI), Oman.

Oman has various tourist attractions, particularly within the realm of cultural tourism. Muscat was named the best city to visit in the world by American travel guide publisher Lonely Planet in 2012, and was chosen as the Capital of Arab Tourism of 2012.

Visa 

Visitors to Oman must obtain a visa prior to travel unless they come from one of the visa exempt countries. Citizens of member nations of the Gulf Cooperation Council may travel to Oman without visa limits. Nationals of 69 other countries can apply for visa online which are valid for a period of 30 days. All visitors must hold a passport valid for 6 months.

Statistics
Excluding the GCC states, the countries with the greatest number of passport holders visiting Oman in 2013 were:

Nature based activities

Beach activities

Oman's coast is lined with many beaches, with resort hotels on the coast west and east of Muscat. Activities including sunbathing, swimming, kitesurfing, diving, snorkeling, boating and water scooters, surfing, beach combing, shell collecting and fishing excursions.

Kitesurfing
The daily sea breeze effect gives rise to reliable kitesurfing conditions. Centres can be found in Muscat, Al Sawadi Beach, Alzaiba Beach and on Masirah Island.

Desert safari

Camelback or four-wheel drive journeys into the Wahiba Sands and other desert areas are popular, sometimes incorporating stays in Barsti huts, barbecues, camel riding, sandboarding and visits to Bedouin communities.

Caving
The limestone rich sedimentary deposits of Oman's mountains have led to cave formation in many places.  In 2008, the Ministry of Tourism issued a plan to develop Majlis al Jinn, the world's second largest cave, as a show cave, after their first show cave, Al Hoota Cave, attracted 75,000 visitors in the first year of operation.  There are caves which can be accessed by amateurs, like Muqal Cave in Wadi Bani and Khalid in Ash Sharqiyah region, while others need considerable effort, training, experience and specialized equipment.

Historic and cultural locations

Markets
Omani souqs (markets) are popular with tourists, and are highly diverse with stalls selling handicrafts such as silver and gold artefacts and textiles. There are souqs in every Omani town, with the Ruwi and Muttrah Souqs the best known in Muscat.

Museums

Forts

Nearly every Omani city and town has a fort, most of which were built, or had major expansions, during the Al-Yarubi dynasty between 1624 and 1744. Their purpose was as a refuge for the people and a last line of defense for the town. Forts were prepared to withstand long sieges with water wells, food storing capacity and secret tunnels ending many kilometers away from the walls of the fort. In times of peace they served as centres of governance, educational establishments or community facilities.

World Heritage Sites
UNESCO's International Heritage Preserve Programme Administration lists four elements of cultural significance in Oman.

Bahla Fort
Part of the capital of the Nabhani dynasty, who dominated Oman and prospered in the Arabian Peninsula during the late Middle Ages.

Archaeological Sites of Bat, Al-Khutm and Al-Ayn

Remnants of settlements and necropolises from the 3rd millennium BCE. The necropolis of Bat reflects the funeral practices of the early Bronze Age.

Land of Frankincense
 
Various sites were important in the production and distribution of frankincense, which was once a sought-after item of luxury in antiquity, including the ancient ports of Khor Rori and Al-Baleed, and the caravan oases of Shisr and Wadi Dawkah

Falaj irrigation systems
Five falajs were inscribed in 2006 to represent an irrigation method dating back to at least 500 CE, and still used in most Omani towns and villages, that distributes water through gravity.

Cultural Events

Muscat Festival
The Muscat Festival is held annually in January and February. International exhibits and displays of traditional Omani lifestyle, art and culture are featured, with circus and street theatre productions are also a part of the event.

Salalah Festival
The Salalah Festival takes place in the months of July and August, when the area is cooler than elsewhere in the Gulf statesand is a family oriented event with cultural, traditional and modern artistic shows.

Cultural theatre program
The Ministry of Tourism organises a number of cultural evenings at the ancient Al Flayj Castle and Al Morooj theatres, hosting groups from around the world, from December to the end of March.

Sporting and adventure events

Horse and camel racing
From September to June, equestrian races organised by the Oman Equestrian Federation are held in various towns.  Public events are staged at the royal stables in Seeb, while most breeders and trainers are based in the Al Kamil/Al Wafi region.

Long distance camel races are held on specially built race tracks, normally on public holidays and during National Day celebrations. As with horse races, camel races are arranged by the OEF, although some regions organize their own local races.

Dubai–Muscat offshore sailing race
The Dubai–Muscat regatta takes place every January. Boats set sail from Dubai, passing through the Straits of Hormuz before heading towards Muscat and ending at the Bandar Al-Rawdah Marina.

Sinbad Classic
An international deep sea fishing contest, the Sinbad Classic is one of the IGFA World Championships qualifying rounds and takes place each April.

Oman Adventure
A five day endurance race held annually in November, each team consists of a runner and a cyclist and must manage the preparation and coordination of their own food and water and other supplies.

Oman International Rally
The Oman International Rally held annually in March, is one of the events that constitute the Middle East Rally Championship.

Bidiyah Challenge
A race to scale sand dunes held every February in Bidiya in Sharqiyah Region.

Tour of Oman
An annual professional road bicycle racing stage race held in Oman since 2010 as part of the UCI Asia Tour. Its stated goals are to promote cycling as a sport in Oman; to put Oman on the world stage as an attractive tourist destination; and stimulate trade and economic activity within the country.

Gallery

See also

Visa policy of Oman
Al Alam Palace
Cities in Oman
Economy of Oman
Geography of Oman
Provinces of Oman
Muscat
Muttrah
Nizwa
Royal Opera House Muscat
Salalah
Shangri-La's Barr Al Jissah Resort & Spa
Sohar
Sur

References

Articles
Vogue magazine chooses Oman as 2008 top destination
Oman shines as hottest new destination
British media shower praises on Oman’s immaculate beauty
Discover Oman: One Land, One Breathtaking Journey Authentic Arabia
The beginner’s guide to Oman
Muscat to Host World Fireworks Championship in December

External links

General 
 Oman Tourism Portal
 Ministry of Information - Tourism Section
 Bradt Guide - Oman
 Lonely Planet - Oman
 Muscat International Airport
 Muscat Travel Portal
 Oman Air
 Oman Tourism and Hospitality Academy
 Geological Society of Oman
 Oman Center for Traditional Music
 Oman World Fireworks Championship 2010
 Kiteboarding Oman - First certified kiteboarding centre in the Gulf region
 Oman History, Culture & Tourism
 Collection of Oman travel and tourism information

Visitors impressions 
 Oman flickr images

 
Oman